Azim Ikzamudinovich Fatullayev (born 7 June 1986) is a Russian former professional football player. He played as a defensive midfielder or centre back.

Club career
He made his Russian Premier League debut for FC Rostov on 2 August 2013 in a game against FC Anzhi Makhachkala.

On 19 February 2019, he joined FC Rotor Volgograd on loan until the end of the 2018–19 season.

On 28 May 2019, he re-signed with Rotor as a free agent.

References

External links
 
 
 

1986 births
Footballers from Makhachkala
Living people
Russian people of Dagestani descent
Russian footballers
Association football midfielders
FC Anzhi Makhachkala players
FC Krasnodar players
FC Rostov players
Russian Premier League players
FC Tosno players
FC Yenisey Krasnoyarsk players
FC Rotor Volgograd players
FC Urozhay Krasnodar players